Nightmare Revisited is a cover album of songs and score from the 1993 Disney animated film The Nightmare Before Christmas. It was released on September 30, 2008 by Walt Disney Records to commemorate the film's 15th anniversary of its theatrical release. In addition to the album's eighteen covers are two re-recordings by original composer Danny Elfman, of the "Opening" and "Closing" tracks. One song featured on the album, Marilyn Manson's "This Is Halloween", was previously released nearly two years earlier, on the 2006 reissue of the film's original soundtrack which, featuring five covers of songs from the film, acted as a precursor to Nightmare Revisited. Enhanced content on the disc features the trailer of The Nightmare Before Christmas.

American psychobilly band Tiger Army also provided a cover of "Oogie Boogie's Song", which was not featured on physical CD editions of Nightmare Revisited, but was released as a digital bonus track. Scott Murphy's cover of "Sally's Song" is also featured on Japanese pressings of the album.

Promotion 
On September 27, 2008, three days before the release of Nightmare Revisited, the album was made available for streaming exclusively by Spin.com.

On September 22, 2008, Evanescence vocalist Amy Lee, who contributed a cover of "Sally's Song" for the album, announced that she would be performing her cover on The Tonight Show with Jay Leno on October 13, 2008. Marilyn Manson similarly performed his cover of "This Is Halloween" (from the reissue of The Nightmare Before Christmas: Original Motion Picture Soundtrack) on The Tonight Show on Halloween two years earlier (October 31, 2006).

Track listing

Personnel 

1. "Overture"
 Produced by DeVotchKa
 Mixed by Greg Macrae

2. "Opening"
 Produced by Danny Elfman
 Narration recorded and mixed by Noah Snyder

3. "This Is Halloween"
 Produced and mixed by Marilyn Manson and Tim Skold

4. "Jack's Lament"
 Vocals: Tyson Ritter
 Everything else: Nick Wheeler
 Produced by The All-American Rejects
 Recorded by Nick Wheeler
 Mixed by Brian Malouf at Cookie Jar Recordings, Studio City, California

5. "Doctor Finkelstein/In the Forest"
 Produced, arranged, and recorded by Amiina
 Mixed and mastered by Amiina and Birgir Jón Birgisson in Reykjavik, Iceland

6. "What's This?"
 Lead vocals: Lacey Mosley
 Drums: James Culpepper
 Guitar: Sameer Bhattacharya
 Guitar: Jared Hartmann
 Bass guitar: Pat Seals
 Produced by Mark Lewis and Flyleaf

7. "Town Meeting Song"
 Produced by The Speakers
 Mixed and engineered by John Congleton

8. "Jack and Sally Montage"
 Violins: Wes Precourt
 Viola: Yevgen Stupka
 Cello: Waul Pianko
 Bass: Vahan Karapetyan
 Produced and arranged by Sasha Ivanov
 Recorded and mixed by Sasha Ivanov at Xact Sound Productions

9. "Jack's Obsession"
 Arranged, mixed and produced by Mark Linkous

10. "Kidnap the Sandy Claws"
 Vocals: Jonathan Davis
 Guitar: James Shaffer
 Bass: Fieldy
 Keyboards: Zac Baird
 Drums: Ray Luzier
 Produced by Korn, Zac Baird and Jim "Bud" Monti
 Recorded and Mixed by Jim "Bud" Monti at KoЯn Studios, Hollywood, California

11. "Making Christmas"
 Vocals, guitar: Tim McIlrath
 Bass, vocals: Joe Principe
 Drums, vocals: Brandon Barnes
 Guitar, vocals: Zach Blair
 Additional backing vocals: Emily Schambra, Jeff Pezzati, Bill Stevenson, Jason Livermore
 Produced and engineered by Bill Stevenson and Jason Livermore
 Additional engineering by Andrew Berlin and Jason Allen
 Mixed by Jason Livermore at the Blasting Room, Ft. Collins, Colorado
 Recorded at Gravity Studios, Chicago, Illinois

12. "Nabbed"
 Piano and synthesizer programming: Akira Inoue
 Produced and arranged by Akira Inoue
 Recorded and mixed by Takayoshi "Dr." Yamanouchi at Sound Inn Studios, Tokyo, Japan

13. "Oogie Boogie's Song"
 Produced by John Leckie and Rodrigo y Gabriela
 Recorded by John Leckie at Sound Factory B, Los Angeles, California
 Mastered by Sean McGee at Abbey Road Studios, London, England

14. "Sally's Song"
 Vocals, piano, harp: Amy Lee
 Drums and programming: Will Hunt
 Bass: Todd Cromwell
 Additional keyboards: Chad Chapelin
 Produced by Will Hunt
 Engineered by Chad Chapelin at Spaceway Studios, Dallas, Texas
 Mixed by Shane Wilson at Pentavarit Studios, Nashville, Tennessee
 Mastered by Ted Jensen at Sterling Sound, New York City

15. "Christmas Eve Montage"
 All instruments: R. Krohn
 Produced by Rjd2 for R J Electrical Connections

16. "Poor Jack"
 Produce by Mike Retando and Tom Higgenson
 Engineered by Justin Wilk at Gravemaster Studios, Chicago, Illinois

17. "To the Rescue"
 Produced by Datarock
 Additional programming and production by Kato Adland and Erlend Fauske

18. "Finale/Reprise"
 Produced and programmed by Chad Petree
 Recorded and mixed at Dangerous Insects Studios, Shawnee, Oklahoma

19. "Closing"
 Produced by Danny Elfman
 Narration recorded and mixed by Noah Snyder

20. "End Title"
 Arranged and performed by Jimmy LaValle
 Violins: Matt Resovich
 Recorded by Jimmy LaValle and Pall Jenkins
 Produced by Jimmy LaValle

 A&R: Dani Markman and Tom MacDougall
 Executive producer: David Agnew
 Business affairs: Jeff Lowy
 Mastered by Stephen Marcussen at Marcussen Mastering, Hollywood, California
 Creative design: Steve Gerdes
 Album design: Steve Sterling

Chart success 

Nightmare Revisited was released on October 27, 2008 in the UK and failed to chart.

See also
 Almost Alice
 List of Billboard Top Holiday Albums number ones of the 2000s
 Muppets: The Green Album
 Frankenweenie: Unleashed!

References

External links 
Official site at Walt Disney Records
Nightmare Revisited at Amazon.com

2008 compilation albums
Alternative metal compilation albums
Alternative rock compilation albums
Covers albums
Disney albums
Gothic rock compilation albums
Halloween albums
Indie rock compilation albums
Industrial metal compilation albums
Punk rock compilation albums
The Nightmare Before Christmas
Tribute albums
Walt Disney Records compilation albums